Argiope keyserlingi is a species of orb-web spider found on the east coast of Australia, from Victoria to northern Queensland. It is very similar in appearance to a closely related north Queensland species, Argiope aetherea. A. keyserlingi is commonly found in large populations in suburban parks and gardens, particularly among the leaves of Lomandra longifolia. Like many species of orb-web spider, A. keyserlingi shows considerable sexual dimorphism, as the females are many times larger than the males. Mature females can be seen during the summer, and seeing multiple males on the web of one female is not uncommon.

A. keyserlingi is commonly known as the St. Andrew's cross spider, due to the construction of bands of silk forming the arms of an X-shaped cross, similar to the one upon which St. Andrew is traditionally said to have been crucified. Juveniles of this species sometimes build a spiral-shaped pattern of silk. Referred to as web decorations or stabilimenta, these bands are thought to increase the species' prey capture rate, but as in other species, they have been found to protect the spider against predators.

A. keyserlingi is an important model species in studies of spider ecology and behaviour. Using this species, scientists have investigated sperm competition, sexual size dimorphism, cryptic female choice, the role of pheromones in mating behaviour, and the function and evolution of web decorations.

Its main predators in Sydney are mantids and birds.

This type of orb-weaver is cathemeral.

Taxonomy
The spider was named by Fredrich Karsch in 1878 after the mythological Greek character of Argiope, a nymph from the town Eleusis in southern Greece. The specific name keyserlingi was chosen to honor arachnologist Eugen von Keyserling.

Description
Females of the species vary from 10 to 16 mm in size. Their glossy carapaces consist of silver, yellow, red, and black bands on their upper segment with two horizontal yellow belts beneath. Males of the species generally vary from 3 to 4 mm in size. They are brown and pearly colored. St. Andrew's cross spiders rest with their legs oriented in pairs.

Distribution and habitat
The St Andrew's cross spider can be found mostly in rainforest margins, open forests, and heathlands of eastern Australia. They can also be found in the northern segment of the Northern Territory, in the northern segment of Tasmania, in the western segment of Western Australia, near Tedi River of Papua New Guinea, in the Malakula island of Vanuatu, in all areas of Lord Howe Island, and even near the Shihe-Shiguan River in China. They construct medium-sized webs on low, shrubby vegetation.

Web
Its web possesses meandering, bluish-white ribbons consisting of silk that can form either a full or partial cross through the center of the web. The purpose of the crucifix-like stabilimentum has long perplexed biologists, who first thought that the stabilimentum's purpose is to strengthen the web. Other ideas associate it with capturing prey or evading its predators, though the purpose of its stabilimentum remains a mystery. One feature of the stabilimentum is that it effectively reflects ultraviolet light, making it attractive to flying insects. Biologists think this may be to increase the chance of catching its prey. The design of the stabilimentum makes the web and the spider obvious to diurnal predators, especially birds and wasps. The shape of this decoration can vary from three shapes, a complete cross, a partial cross possessing one to three arms, or occasionally an absence of a decoration. This variability can induce web-recognition problems for predators. Biologists also found a possibility that the stabilimentum may be a warning to predators to stay away.

Diet
Prey of the St Andrew's cross spider include flies, moths, butterflies, bees, and other insects. The orb-weaver wraps its prey immaculately with silk before digesting, and smaller prey may be prioritized.

Threat response
When the orb-weaver is threatened, it responds by either ejecting from its web or vibrating the web strenuously so the web becomes a blur, confusing its predator. These two methods may not always succeed, though, as sometimes their corpses can be found in mud cells of wasps and their webs can be left empty and damaged.

Breeding
Mating takes place from summer to autumn and is a perilous occasion for miniature male St Andrew's cross spiders. Males settles on the upper segment of the web, some of them may even be missing legs, caused by encountering inhospitable females. The male then materializes a mating thread within the web, which it attracts the hospitable female by oscillating the thread. The female then hangs her pear-shaped sac in a mesh of threads, frequently surrounded by leaves to camouflage the sac's greenish silk, because  egg sacs are the target of wasps and flies.

References

Further reading

 Platnick, Norman I. (2008): The world spider catalog, version 8.5. American Museum of Natural History.

External links

 Description, distribution of A. keyserlingi
 St Andrews Cross Spider  - Youtube

keyserlingi
Spiders of Australia
Spiders described in 1878